Alfred James Conn (born 5 April 1952) is a Scottish former professional footballer, who was the first post-World War II player to play for both Old Firm rivals Rangers and Celtic.

Background

Conn is the son of the footballer Alfie Conn Sr., who was one of the 'Terrible Trio' of Heart of Midlothian in the 1950s.

Career

Rangers

Conn made his senior debut for Rangers against Dundalk in the Fairs Cup tournament in November 1968. He was part of the Rangers team which lifted the European Cup Winners' Cup in 1972 and also helped the Ibrox team win the Scottish Cup in 1973, scoring their second goal in a 3–2 final victory over Celtic at Hampden Park.

Tottenham Hotspur

He played for Tottenham Hotspur football club from 1974 to 1977. He was the last player to be signed by their manager Bill Nicholson. Despite playing only 35 games and scoring six goals, he was a huge fan favourite, dubbed the "King of White Hart Lane" after scoring a hat-trick on his debut in a 5–2 win at Newcastle. In the final game of the 1974–75 season at White Hart Lane, Tottenham Hotspur had to beat Leeds United to prevent relegation from the First Division. Conn scored a goal, set up two others and even sat on the ball in a 4–2 victory.

When at Spurs he made two appearances for the Scotland national football team at the end of the season in 1975.

Celtic

He later, in 1977, won another Scottish Cup medal with Celtic when they defeated Rangers 1–0 in the final.

Heart of Midlothian

Conn Jr. followed in his father's footsteps by signing for the Tynecastle club in 1980, following a short spell playing indoor football in the United States with Pittsburgh Spirit.

Blackpool and Motherwell

Conn wound down his career with short spells at Blackpool and Motherwell before retiring in 1983.

Legacy

On 5 February 2007 Conn was included in the Rangers F.C. Hall of Fame.

See also
Played for Celtic and Rangers

References

External links 
 
 What's it all about now Alfie? Retrieved 9 March 2009
 Daily Record profile, Jan 30 2008
 NASL/MISL stats

1952 births
Living people
Footballers from Kirkcaldy
Scottish footballers
Scotland international footballers
Rangers F.C. players
Tottenham Hotspur F.C. players
Celtic F.C. players
Derby County F.C. players
Hércules CF players
Heart of Midlothian F.C. players
Motherwell F.C. players
Blackpool F.C. players
Scottish Football League players
English Football League players
Scottish expatriate footballers
Expatriate footballers in Spain
Expatriate soccer players in the United States
Scotland under-23 international footballers
Pittsburgh Spirit players
San Jose Earthquakes (1974–1988) players
North American Soccer League (1968–1984) players
Association football midfielders
Scottish expatriate sportspeople in the United States